"Das Altbierlied" (The Altbier song) is a schlager drinking song originally by Hans Ludwig Lonsdorfer.

Die Toten Hosen cover

"Das Altbierlied" was covered by Die Toten Hosen for the album Damenwahl, from which it was released as the only single.

Track listing
 "Das Altbierlied" (Lonsdorfer) − 3:15
 "Übung macht den Meister" (Practice makes perfect) (von Holst/Frege) – 1:59
 "Bis zum bitteren Ende" (Till to the bitter end) (Frege/Frege)

1986 singles
Die Toten Hosen songs
Carnival songs
German-language songs
Year of song missing